A list of Nicaraguan writers, including novelists, poets, authors, essayists, journalists, critics, and narrators among others.

List

 Claribel Alegría (1924–2018), poet, she received the Neustadt International Prize for Literature in 2006.
 Emilio Álvarez Lejarza (1884–1969), writer
 Emilio Álvarez Montalván (1919–2014), political writer
 June Beer (1935-1986) Afro-Nicaraguan poet and artist.
 Gioconda Belli (1948), poet
 Yolanda Blanco (1954), poet and translator.
 Tomás Borge (1930–2012), writer, poet, and essayist. 
 Omar Cabezas (1950), writer
 Ernesto Cardenal (1925–2020), poet
 Blanca Castellón (1958), poet
 José Coronel Urtecho (1906–1994), poet, translator, essayist, critic, narrator, playwright, and historian.
 Alfonso Cortés (1893–1969), poet
 Arturo Cruz (1954), writer
 Pablo Antonio Cuadra (1912–2002), poet
 Rubén Darío (1867–1916), poet, referred to as The Father of Modernism.
 Omar D'León (1929), poet 
 Karly Gaitán Morales (born 1980), Nicaraguan film historian, and writer.
 Ana Ilce Gómez Ortega (1944–2017), poet
 Salomón Ibarra Mayorga (1887–1985), poet and lyricist of "Salve a ti, Nicaragua", the Nicaraguan national anthem. 
 Erwin Krüger (1915–1973), poet and composer.
 Rigoberto López Pérez (1929–1956), poet and writer.
 Francisco Mayorga (1949), writer
 Camilo Mejía (1975), author
 Tony Meléndez (1962), writer
 Rosario Murillo (1951), poet
 Humberto Ortega (1947), author
 Azarías H. Pallais (1884–1954), poet
 Joaquín Pasos (1914–1947), poet
 Horacio Peña (1946), writer and poet
 Sergio Ramírez (1942), writer
 Mariana Sansón Argüello (1918–2002), poet
 Arlen Siu (1955-1975), essayist
 Julio Valle Castillo (1952), poet, novelist, essayist, literary critic and art critic
 Daisy Zamora (1950), poet

See also

Nicaraguan
 List
Writers